Claxton School is a historic school building located at Asheville, Buncombe County, North Carolina. It was built in 1922–1925, and is a three-story, Neoclassical school building constructed of hollow clay tile. It is faced with cast concrete stone veneer. The original two-story auditorium is located at the rear of the building.

It was listed on the National Register of Historic Places in 1992.

References

School buildings on the National Register of Historic Places in North Carolina
Neoclassical architecture in North Carolina
School buildings completed in 1925
Buildings and structures in Asheville, North Carolina
National Register of Historic Places in Buncombe County, North Carolina
1925 establishments in North Carolina